San Silvestre (Italian and Spanish for Saint Sylvester) can refer to:

San Silvestre de Guzmán, Spain
San Silvestre School, Lima, Peru
San Silvestre Vallecana
A frazione of Silvi, Abruzzo

See also
San Silvestro in Capite